South Jersey Radio Association (SJRA) is an amateur radio organization. First organized June 12, 1916  and affiliated with the American Radio Relay League since 1920, SJRA lays claim to be the oldest "continuously" operating amateur radio club in the United States. SJRA  operates the K2AA 2 Meter communications Repeater on 145.290 MHz, which is located in Medford, NJ and covers the metro Philadelphia, PA area. SJRA also operates the K2UK Repeater in Pine Hill, NJ on 146.865 mHz  2 meters and 442.350 mHz 70 cm Band. The SJRA publishes a monthly newsletter called Harmonics and has been doing so for over 50 years. The SJRA has been affiliated with the American Radio Relay League since 1920.

Awards
The SJRA offers 2 awards to the general amateur radio community.

VHF Colonial Award
The VHF Colonial award is to operators who provide proof of a two way direct contact with each of the original Thirteen Colonies over amateur radio on frequencies of 50 MHz or above.

South Jersey Radio Association Achievement Certificate
The South Jersey Radio Association Achievement Certificate is given to amateur radio operators who provide proof of a two way contact with at least 50 of the SJRA's members.

References

External links
South Jersey Radio Association Website
FCC License information for K2AA

Ham radio operators, come in: Field Day is for you

Amateur radio organizations